Jaunjelgavas apriņķis was a historic county of the Courland Governorate and of the Republic of Latvia. Its capital was Jaunjelgava (Friedrichstadt).

History 
Initially, the Captaincy of Friedrichstadt was as a subdivision of the Duchy of Courland and Semigallia. In 1795, the Duchy was incorporated into the Russian Empire, and in 1819 Friedrichstadt County (Kreis Friedrichstadt) became one of the ten counties of the Courland Governorate. 

After the establishment of the Republic of Latvia in 1918, the Jaunjelgavas apriņķis existed until 1924, when it was renamed to Jēkabpils apriņķis.

Demographics
At the time of the Russian Empire Census of 1897, Kreis Friedrichstadt had a population of 64,795. Of these, 83.0% spoke Latvian, 9.3% Yiddish, 2.8% German, 2.6% Russian, 1.2% Lithuanian, 0.8% Polish, 0.2% Romani and 0.1% Belarusian as their native language.

References

  
Uezds of Courland Governorate